Bärbel Kofler (born 24 May 1967) is a German politician of the Social Democratic Party (SPD) who has been serving as Parliamentary State Secretary in the Federal Ministry for Economic Cooperation and Development in the coalition government of Chancellor Olaf Scholz since 2021. She has been a member of the Bundestag from the state of Bavaria since 2004. 

From 2016 until 2021, Kofler served as Federal Government Commissioner for Human Rights Policy and Humanitarian Assistance at the Federal Foreign Office in the government of Chancellor Angela Merkel.

Political career 
On 21 September 2004 Kofler moved to the Bundestag to replace the late Hans Büttner, representing the Berchtesgadener Land and Traunstein districts.

In parliament, Kofler has been a member of the Committee on Foreign Affairs since 2009. She has also served on the Committee on Economic Cooperation and Development (2005-2016); the Sub-Committee on the United Nations (2006-2009); the Committee on Human Rights and Humanitarian Aid (2004-2005); and the Finance Committee (2004-2005). In addition to her committee assignments, she chaired the German-Ukrainian Parliamentary Friendship Group from 2006 until 2013.

Within the SPD parliamentary group, Kofler belongs to the Parliamentary Left, a left-wing movement.

In the negotiations to form a Grand Coalition of the Christian Democrats (CDU together with the Bavarian CSU) and the SPD under the leadership of Chancellor Angela Merkel following the 2013 elections, Kofler was part of the SPD delegation in the working group on the environment and agriculture, led by Katherina Reiche and Ute Vogt. In similar negotiations following the 2017 federal elections, she was part of the working group on foreign policy, led by Ursula von der Leyen, Gerd Müller and Sigmar Gabriel.

In the negotiations to form a so-called traffic light coalition of the SPD, the Green Party and the Free Democratic Party (FDP) following the 2021 federal elections, Kofler was again part of her party's delegation in the working group on foreign policy, defence, development cooperation and human rights, this time co-chaired by Heiko Maas, Omid Nouripour and Alexander Graf Lambsdorff.

Other activities 
 action medeor, Member of the advisory board (since 2016)
 Aktion Deutschland Hilft (Germany's Relief Coalition), Member of the Board of Trustees (since 2016)
 German Institute for Human Rights (DIMR), Member of the Board of Trustees (since 2016)
 Center for International Peace Operations (ZIF), Member of the supervisory board (since 2014)
 German Foundation for World Population (DSW), Member of the Parliamentary Advisory Board
 IG BCE, Member
 IG Metall, Member
 German Corporation for International Cooperation (GIZ), Member of the Board of Trustees (2014-2016)

References

External links 

  
 Bundestag biography 

1967 births
Living people
Members of the Bundestag for Bavaria
Female members of the Bundestag
21st-century German women politicians
Members of the Bundestag 2021–2025
Members of the Bundestag 2017–2021
Members of the Bundestag 2013–2017
Members of the Bundestag 2009–2013
Members of the Bundestag 2005–2009
Members of the Bundestag 2002–2005
Members of the Bundestag for the Social Democratic Party of Germany
People from Berchtesgadener Land